The 2009 BMW Tennis Championship was a professional men's tennis tournament played on outdoor hard courts. It was part of the 2009 ATP Challenger Tour. It took place in Sunrise, Florida, United States between 16 and 22 March 2009.

Singles entrants

Seeds

Rankings are as of March 9, 2009.

Other entrants
The following players received wildcards into the singles main draw:
  Tomáš Berdych
  Thomas Johansson
  Stefan Koubek
  Wayne Odesnik

The following players received entry from the qualifying draw:
  Denis Gremelmayr
  Evgeny Korolev
  Björn Phau
  Robin Söderling

Champions

Men's singles

 Robin Söderling def.  Tomáš Berdych, 6–1, 6–1

Men's doubles

 Eric Butorac /  Bobby Reynolds def.  Jeff Coetzee /  Jordan Kerr, 5–7, 6–4, 10–4

External links
Official website
2009 Draws

BMW Tennis Championship
BMW Tennis Championship